Víctor Marcelino Aquino Romero (born 26 November 1985) is a Paraguayan footballer who plays for César Vallejo as a forward.

Career
Aguino signed for Marítimo in January 2009. He made his debut on 1 February against Naval, coming on as a substitute and scoring the winning goal in the 88th minute, in the 1–0 victory.

After a short spell at Portuguese club, he returned to Paraguay for Nacional Asunción in August 2009.

On 26 December 2016, it was reported that he signed for the K League Challenge side Seoul E-Land. However, the transfer did not go through and on 30 December 2016, he signed for Deportivo Táchira.

References

External links

1985 births
Living people
Paraguayan footballers
Association football forwards
Paraguayan expatriate footballers
Paraguayan Primera División players
Argentine Primera División players
Primera Nacional players
Primeira Liga players
Ascenso MX players
Categoría Primera A players
Venezuelan Primera División players
Peruvian Primera División players
Club Nacional footballers
Newell's Old Boys footballers
C.S. Marítimo players
Deportivo Táchira F.C. players
Club Deportivo Palestino footballers
Club Sportivo San Lorenzo footballers
Club Atlético Belgrano footballers
Crucero del Norte footballers
Deportivo Santaní players
Deportivo Pasto footballers
Águilas Doradas Rionegro players
Deportivo La Guaira players
Club Deportivo Universidad César Vallejo footballers
Expatriate footballers in Chile
Expatriate footballers in Argentina
Expatriate footballers in Colombia
Expatriate footballers in Mexico
Expatriate footballers in Portugal
Expatriate footballers in Venezuela
Expatriate footballers in Peru
Paraguayan expatriate sportspeople in Chile
Paraguayan expatriate sportspeople in Portugal
Paraguayan expatriate sportspeople in Colombia
Paraguayan expatriate sportspeople in Mexico
Paraguayan expatriate sportspeople in Argentina
Paraguayan expatriate sportspeople in Venezuela
Paraguayan expatriate sportspeople in Peru